Canon Edward Joseph Hannan (Irish: Éamonn Seosamh Ó hAnnáin) (1836–1891) was an Irish-born priest, mainly remembered as the founder of Hibernian Football Club in Edinburgh.

Life

He was born in Ballingarry, County Limerick on 21 June 1836.
Hannon went to the minor seminary of St Munchin's College, Limerick, in 1853, before moving to All Hallows College, Dublin, in 1855, where he complete his studies and was ordained as a priest in 1860.

He remained in All Hallows for a year before, going to Edinburgh in 1861 on holiday and was persuaded to stay by the bishop to run the recently re-inaugurated St Patricks. During his long period in Edinburgh he did much to address the social problems of the poorer Catholics in the city, and founded a local branch of the Catholic Young Mens Society (CYMS) in 1865, which had been founded in Ireland by his uncle, Monsignor Richard B. O'Brien (who taught in All Hallows when Hannan was there). In 1871 he became priest in charge at St Patricks. He did much for the inhabitants of "Little Ireland", the Irish community in Edinburgh, centred around the Cowgate.
In 1875, together with the 21 year old Michael Whelahan (originally from Co. Roscommon in Ireland) of the CYMS, and in part to mark the centenary of Daniel O'Connell's birth, he founded Hibernian Football Club. Hannan served as the club's first Manager and as President until his death. Despite only starting as a church club Canon Hannan did much lobbying resulting in acceptance of the team playing for the Scottish Cup in 1877, only two years after their foundation.
He lived in the house attached to St Patricks Church.

He died of pneumonia on 24 June 1891.

He is buried on the western path of the original part of Grange Cemetery in southern Edinburgh. The large white marble memorial was restored By Hibernian Historical Trust in 2006.

References

1836 births
1891 deaths
Burials at the Grange Cemetery
Clergy from County Limerick
19th-century Irish Roman Catholic priests
Clergy from Edinburgh
Deaths from pneumonia in Scotland
19th-century Scottish Roman Catholic priests
People educated at St Munchin's College
Alumni of All Hallows College, Dublin
Hibernian F.C. non-playing staff